Vareh is a village in Qaemabad Rural District, in the Central District of Shahriar County, Tehran Province, Iran. At the 2006 census, its population was 15,318, in 3,735 families.

References 

Populated places in Shahriar County